The Strickland River is a major river in the Western Province of Papua New Guinea. It is the longest and largest tributary of the Fly River with a total length of  including the Lagaip River the farthest distance  river source of the Strickland River. It was named after Edward Strickland, vice-president of the Geographical Society of Australasia by the New Guinea Exploration Expedition of 1885.

Tributary

Strickland River List of tributaries by length. 

Lagaip River  
 Ok Om River 
 Upper Lagaip River  
Kera River 
 Porgera River

Environmental concerns 

The Porgera Gold Mine, run by Barrick Gold, is a mine near the Strickland, which is the source of environmental concerns in the area. Since 1992, Barrick Gold has dumped mine waste, particularly metal particulates or tailings, directly into the river. This process of riverine disposal by the mine has led to much controversy, with numerous deaths and environmental problems being blamed on the metal particulates.

See also
Strickland River languages

References

Further reading 
 Chairperson Quits Over River Pollution at Placer Dome’s Porgera Mine in Papua New Guinea
 Danny Kennedy: Ok Tedi All Over Again. Placer and the Porgera Gold Mine

Rivers of Papua New Guinea
Fly River